The Trinity Lyceum Higher Secondary School was founded in 1966 in the Kollam District by the Late Bishop of Quilon, Rt. Rev. Dr. Jerome. M. Fernandez. Trinity Lyceum educates people in the Kollam District in the fields of Arts, Commerce, Technology and Science
The school conducts annual sports and arts festival and ensures complete participation from the students side.

Notable alumni
 Raja Vijayaraghavan V., Judge High Court of Kerala

References

External links 
 "Official Site of hacked"

Private schools in Kerala
Christian schools in Kerala
Primary schools in Kerala
High schools and secondary schools in Kerala
Schools in Kollam
Educational institutions established in 1966
1966 establishments in Kerala